Chaprote is one of the earliest villages in the Nagar District in the Gilgit-Baltistan region.  It is a scenic area, in which the literacy rate is more than 90%. The village consists of 500 families and more than 10 tribes. Khimitay, Khanny, Masuty, Duguray and Bekhdury are well known families in the region. 

Many miles of terraced fields and fruit orchards mark Chaprote, the earlier capital of Nagar Valley. It offers a panoramic view of the Rakaposhi and other peaks surrounding Nagar Valley. The total area of the valley is around 8 miles. Moreover, there is a tourist spot which called GAPA which gives a view of Rakaposhi Peak.

Chaprote is the center of a form of shamanism called "Danyalism".

References 

Villages in Pakistan